The 2022 Italian Athletics Championships was the 112th edition of the Italian Athletics Championships and took place in Rieti, Lazio (Stadio Raul Guidobaldi), from 24 to 26 June.

The Italian championships of the men's and women's 35 km racewalk took place in Pescara on January 16. The cross country championships took place in Trieste on 12 and 13 March. The 10,000m championships took place in Brescia on May 1.

Champions

Track & Field + Road events (Rieti 24-26 June)

35 km walk (Pescara 16 January)

Cross country (Trieste 12-13 March)

10,000 m (Brescia 1 May)

20 km walk (Alberobello 1 May)

See also
2022 Italian Athletics Indoor Championships

References

External links
 All results at FIDAL web site

Italian Athletics Championships
Athletics
Italian Athletics Outdoor Championships